Jack's Fish Spot is a fish market and seafood bar at Seattle's Pike Place Market, in the U.S. state of Washington.

Description 
The fish market and seafood bar Jack's Fish Spot operates in Pike Place Market's Sanitary Market building, in the Central Waterfront district of Seattle. The business has stocked dungeness crab, manila clams, flounder, mussels, sockeye and king salmon, and oysters. The counter's menu has included fish and chips, cioppino, New England-style clam chowder, halibut, fried salmon, fish tacos, and whole steamed crab. Thrillist says, "It's a great spot to post up, slurp some oysters (heck, you can even watch their journey from the ice display case out front, to the shucking counter, and to your plate), or feast on some delicious fish and chips."

History 
Jack's Fish Spot was established in 1982. Former commercial fisherman Jack Mathers owns the business.

Reception 
Seattle Metropolitan has said, "The stools, if you can get one at all, are cracked and worn. The last diner likely didn't bother to clean his crumbs off the tiny metal counter. View this well-loved Pike Place Market joint as a greasy spoon that serves pristine seafood ... and you'll find its true charms." Jenny Kuglin included the business in Seattle Refined 2014 list of "5 of Seattle's tastiest oyster bars". In 2015, Tobias Coughlin-Bogue of The Stranger wrote: 

Naomi Tomky included the raw oysters in Thrillist's 2016 list of "The 50 Best Things to Eat and Drink at Pike Place Market". In Eater Seattle's 2019 overview of "The Greatest Places to Eat in Seattle's Greatest Tourist Trap", Lesley Balla wrote, "For traditional New England-style clam chowder, Jack's Fish Spot ... is the move: It's richer, thicker, and more peppery than others, with a big bread bowl that makes a nice prelude to crispy fish and chips there." Chelsea Lin and Tomky included the cioppino in Seattle Magazine's 2020 list of "The 100 Best Things to Eat in the Seattle Area Right Now: Seafood Edition".

See also 

 List of seafood restaurants

References

External links 

 
 Jack's Fish Spot at Pike Place Market
 Jack's Fish and Chips at Pike Place Market
 Jack's Fish Spot at Zomato

1982 establishments in Washington (state)
American companies established in 1982
Central Waterfront, Seattle
Fish markets
Pike Place Market
Seafood restaurants in Seattle
Restaurants established in 1982